Margaret J. "Tucka" Healy (born September 20, 1962) is an American former soccer player who played as a forward, making three appearances for the United States women's national team. She later worked as an employee for Google.

Career
In college, Healy played for the California Golden Bears from 1981 to 1985, though she missed the 1984 season. Her first season in 1981 was under the AIAW, while the remaining were in the NCAA. In her NCAA career, she scored 45 goals and had 10 assists. She was an NSCAA Third Team All-American in 1983 and 1985, and was included in the NSCAA All-Region team in 1985. In 2015, she was inducted into the "Lair of Legends" of the California Golden Bears, as part of the athletics hall of fame.

Healy made her international debut for the United States in the team's inaugural match on August 18, 1985 at the Mundialito against hosts Italy. In total, she made three appearances for the U.S. at the tournament, earning her final cap on August 24, 1985 against Denmark.

Personal life
Healy was born to Mary and John Helding "Jack" Healy, one of five children. At a young age, her family moved from the Denver area to Palo Alto, California. Healy was employee 81 at Google in Mountain View, California, where she worked as an enterprise sales manager, and later for the YouTube partner program, Google Fiber, and YouTube TV.

Career statistics

International

References

1962 births
Living people
Soccer players from Colorado
Sportspeople from Palo Alto, California
Soccer players from California
American women's soccer players
United States women's international soccer players
Women's association football forwards
California Golden Bears women's soccer players
Google employees